Paavo Ilmari Yrjölä (18 June 1902 in Hämeenkyrö – 11 February 1980 in Vilppula), also known as the Bear of Hämeenkyrö (Hämeenkyrön karhu), was a Finnish track and field athlete who won the gold medal in the decathlon at the 1928 Summer Olympics. He also competed in shot put and high jump at the same Games, and in decathlon in 1924 and 1932, but less successfully.

In the 1928 Olympics, he had to rerun the 100 m hurdles as the fourth hurdle was placed incorrectly in the first run.
Finland took the top two spots in the decathlon that year with Yrjölä taking the gold (with a world record) and Akilles Järvinen the silver.

In his years of competing, Yrjölä set three officially ratified world records: 7820 points in 1926 (6460 according to the current scoring tables and with standard manual timing corrections of 0.24 seconds for 100 metres and 110 metre hurdles, 0.14 seconds for 400 metres and nothing for 1500 metres), 7995 points in 1927 (6586) and 8053 in the 1928 Summer Olympics (6587). Yrjölä was the first decathlete to score higher than Jim Thorpe at the 1912 Summer Olympics. Thorpe's performance wasn't officially recognized as a record due to his semi-professional status. Yrjölä set one more record in 1930 of 8117 points (6700), but this wasn't officially ratified.

Athletics was a family affair as his brother, Iivari Yrjölä, competed in the decathlon at the 1924 Olympics, and his son, Matti Yrjölä, was a successful shotputter.

Major achievements 
 Ninth in the decathlon at the 1924 Summer Olympics in Paris (5,547 points)
 A gold medal in the decathlon at the 1928 Summer Olympics in Amsterdam (6,587 points)
 Sixth in the decathlon at the 1932 Summer Olympics in Los Angeles (6,385 points)
 Ninth in the shot put at the 1928 Summer Olympics in Amsterdam
 Finnish Champion in 1925, 1926 and 1927

Records 
 100 m: 11.6 s
 long jump: 676 
 shot put: 14.72 m (1930)
 high jump: 187 cm (1924)
 400 m: 51.9 
 110 m hurdles: 15.5 
 discus throw: 43.26 
 pole vault: 330 
 javelin: 62.15 
 1500 m: 4.26:8 
 decathlon: 6700 points (8117 with then current scoring tables) in 1930
 pentathlon: 3532 points (4067)

References

1902 births
1980 deaths
People from Hämeenkyrö
People from Turku and Pori Province (Grand Duchy of Finland)
Finnish decathletes
Athletes (track and field) at the 1924 Summer Olympics
Athletes (track and field) at the 1928 Summer Olympics
Athletes (track and field) at the 1932 Summer Olympics
Olympic athletes of Finland
Olympic gold medalists for Finland
Medalists at the 1928 Summer Olympics
Olympic gold medalists in athletics (track and field)
Olympic decathletes
Sportspeople from Pirkanmaa